Douglas "Doug" Cliggott (born 1956) is the former U.S. equity strategist at Credit Suisse. He was appointed to that position in 2009. Formerly he was the CIO of Dover Management LLC. He joined the Greenwich, CT based firm in December 2006. Cliggott was a managing director and chief investment strategist at J.P. Morgan & Company and JPMorgan Chase between September 1996 and February 2002. In 2002 he left JP Morgan to head the U.S. office of Swedish asset management firm Brummer & Partners, a J.P. Morgan client. Cliggott has since returned to the University of Massachusetts Amherst as a lecturer and professor.

Cliggott holds a BA in Economics from the University of Massachusetts Amherst and an MA from The New School.

References

External links
Smartmoney.com: Pundit Watch: Doug Cliggott
JP Morgan's Ciggott steps down - Feb. 14, 2002
Brummer & Partners

1958 births
Living people
Economists from New York (state)
The New School alumni
University of Massachusetts Amherst College of Social and Behavioral Sciences alumni
Credit Suisse people
21st-century American economists